Afromaimetsha robusta is an extinct species of wasp which existed in Botswana during the late Cretaceous period, and the only species in the genus Afromaimetsha.

References

Stephanoidea
Prehistoric Hymenoptera genera
Late Cretaceous insects
Hymenoptera of Africa
Fossil taxa described in 2009
Late Cretaceous animals of Africa